Sérgio Guimarães da Silva Júnior (born 19 February 1979), commonly known as Sérgio Júnior, is a Brazilian former professional footballer who played as a forward.

Career
Sérgio Júnior has played club football for several Brazilian clubs throughout his career. He has also spent several seasons playing in the Peruvian first division, winning the 2003 Apertura championship with Sporting Cristal. He had also had spells playing in China, Portugal, South Korea, Saudi Arabia.

References

External links
 
 
 
 
 

1979 births
Living people
Association football forwards
Brazilian footballers
Vitória S.C. players
Jeju United FC players
K League 1 players
Sporting Cristal footballers
Cienciano footballers
América Futebol Clube (RN) players
Expatriate footballers in Peru
Expatriate footballers in China
Brazilian expatriate sportspeople in China
Primeira Liga players
Brazilian expatriate sportspeople in South Korea
Expatriate footballers in South Korea
Expatriate footballers in Portugal
Brazilian expatriate sportspeople in Portugal
Brazilian expatriate footballers